Zinc finger protein 664 is a protein that in humans is encoded by the ZNF664 gene.

References

Further reading